Agar Wynne (15 July 185012 May 1934) was an Australian  lawyer and politician. He began his career in the Victorian Legislative Council and served two terms as Solicitor-General of Victoria. In 1906, he transferred to the federal House of Representatives. He was Postmaster-General of Australia in the Cook Government from 1913 to 1914, but retired from federal politics at the 1914 election. He re-entered Victorian politics and briefly served as Attorney-General of Victoria (1917–1918).

Early life
Wynne was born in London, but his family emigrated to Australia when he was a child.  He educated at Melbourne Church of England Grammar School and enrolled in an articled clerk's course at the University of Melbourne and was admitted as an attorney in July 1874. He married Mary Jane Robertson, née Smith, a widow with two children in November 1886.  She died in 1889 and in February 1896 he married Annie Dudgeon, née Samuel, a widow with three children.

Colonial politics
In 1888, Wynne won the seat of Western Province in the Victorian Legislative Council which he held until 1903 and was Postmaster-General and Solicitor-General from 1893 to 1894 in Sir James Patterson's government and Solicitor-General from 1900 to 1902 in Sir George Turner's and Sir Alexander Peacock's governments.

Federal politics
Wynne won the seat of Balaclava at the 1906 elections in the Australian House of Representatives as an Independent Protectionist. He joined the Fusion government and served as Postmaster-General in the Cook Ministry from June 1913 to its fall in September 1914, but he did not contest the 1914 elections, apparently because he could not reorganise his department to run on efficient business principles.

State politics and later life

Wynne returned to Victorian politics in 1917, winning the state seat of St Kilda and was Attorney-General, Solicitor-General, Minister of Railways and a Vice-President of the Board of Land and Works from November 1917 to March 1918 in Sir John Bowser's government. He did not stand for re-election in 1920.

Personal life
In 1910, Wynne acquired Nerrin Nerrin, a  property near Streatham, Victoria. He ran merino sheep, raised Thoroughbred horses and created a wildlife sanctuary. He also had pastoral interests elsewhere in Victoria and in Queensland.

Wynne was a committee member of the Victoria Racing Club from 1905. He won the Australian Cup twice, with Great Scot in 1903 and Peru in 1908. He also served terms as president of the Melbourne Swimming Club, the St Kilda Yacht Club, the Melbourne Club, and the Athenaeum Club.

A supporter of the war effort, in 1917 Wynne offered £500 to the first member of the proposed Sportsman's Battalion to win the Victoria Cross.

Wynne suffered a series of strokes late in life and died at Nerrin Nerrin on 12 May 1934, aged 83. He was survived by the daughter of his first marriage.

References

Sources
 Richardson, N. (2016) The Game of their lives, Pan Macmillan: Sydney. .

1850 births
1934 deaths
Commonwealth Liberal Party members of the Parliament of Australia
Independent members of the Parliament of Australia
Nationalist Party of Australia members of the Parliament of Victoria
Members of the Australian House of Representatives for Balaclava
Members of the Australian House of Representatives
Members of the Victorian Legislative Assembly
Members of the Victorian Legislative Council
Members of the Cabinet of Australia
Attorneys-General of Victoria
Solicitors-General of Victoria
Politicians from London
Lawyers from London
Melbourne Law School alumni
People educated at Melbourne Grammar School
20th-century Australian politicians
Australian racehorse owners and breeders